"The Raincoats" is a two-part episode of the American sitcom Seinfeld. It is the 82nd and 83rd episode of the show, and the 18th and 19th episodes of the fifth season. The episode was first shown on NBC on April 28, 1994, and garnered an Emmy nomination for Outstanding Guest Actor in a Comedy Series for Judge Reinhold.

The episode was written by Tom Gammill, Max Pross, Larry David, and Jerry Seinfeld and directed by Tom Cherones. The episode's storylines include George trying to weasel his way out of a commitment to the Big Brother program, Elaine's discomfort with her boyfriend's friendliness, Morty scheming to sell boxes of raincoats he designed before he and Helen go on vacation, and Jerry and his girlfriend being caught making out at a theatrical showing of Schindler's List.

Plot

Part 1
Jerry's parents are staying with him for three days until they leave for Paris, leaving him yearning for some private time with his girlfriend, Rachel, who lives with her parents. Alec approaches George in Monk's with an offer to join the Big Brother program. George reluctantly agrees to look after young Joey. He asks Helen and Morty to send a postcard to Alec from Paris, so it looks like he is in Paris, thus getting out of the Big Brother program. George invites Morty and Helen over for dinner with his parents, but they claim they have plans for the night. In reality, they can't stand George's parents Frank and Estelle. Elaine brings her new boyfriend Aaron up to the apartment. Aaron stands unusually close to others when speaking to them. Aaron volunteers to escort Jerry’s parents on a behind-the-scenes tour of the Metropolitan Museum of Art. After they leave, Jerry phones Rachel, but she is not home. By the time Rachel calls Jerry back, his parents have returned. Kramer greets Helen and Morty. Morty notices Kramer’s raincoat, which is the Executive line (a belt-less model, created by Morty years ago). Kramer says they are a hot item at Rudy’s Antique Boutique. Morty makes plans to get Jack Klompus to send his boxes of unsold Executives up to New York City before he leaves for Paris.

When George tells Alec about his invented trip to Paris, Alec replies that this is great news: Joey’s estranged father lives in Paris but Joey is too scared to fly alone. George goes down to Rudy’s to sell Frank’s old clothes, claiming his father has died. Kramer arrives and explains to George how he and Morty went into business over an impromptu dinner; this alerts George that the Seinfelds lied about having plans, which outrages him. Elaine questions Aaron's actions with Helen and Morty, considering them abnormally nice. Aaron takes Elaine to see a stage production of My Fair Lady, and acquires additional tickets for Helen and Morty. Elaine is annoyed at having to share her date with them. George spots the group riding in a buggy and tells his parents the Seinfelds were avoiding them again.

When the Costanzas make plans to go on a cruise, Frank realizes his vacation clothes are missing. Rudy sells some of Frank's clothes to Kramer, and burns the rest after discovering them to be moth-ridden.

Part 2
Jerry and Rachel go to see Schindler's List but cannot help making out since they have not been alone in such a long time. Newman, also in the cinema, spots them. When Jerry arrives back at his apartment, Helen and Morty quiz him about the movie and Jerry bluffs his way through. George goes to Rudy’s to buy back his father’s clothes, and is told of their fate.

Newman informs Helen and Morty of Jerry and Rachel's making out. When the Seinfelds rebuke Jerry, he realizes Newman must have told. Jack Klompus rings again to tell Morty he had to break a window to get into the garage and that the Executives will be in New York City by 2:00 in the afternoon the next day. Since their flight is at 3:00, Morty decides to cancel the trip to Paris. George asks Jerry for the tickets to Paris, as they are non-refundable. Kramer arrives at the Costanzas' for dinner. Frank notices Kramer is wearing one of his missing vacation shirts, which forces George to confess that he sold Frank's clothes.

Rudy refuses to buy the Executives from Kramer and Morty; after his store was infested with moths from Frank's clothes, he now has a policy of not buying clothes off the street. Frank arrives to buy back his clothes and argues with Morty. At the airport, Jerry and Elaine say farewell to Morty and Helen as they leave to return to Florida. Aaron goes crazy, thinking he could have done more for them while they were in New York City. Rachel’s father forbids her from seeing Jerry again after Newman informs him of their behavior at Schindler's List.

Back at Monk’s, Jerry tells Elaine that his parents were robbed because Jack Klompus never fixed the broken window. Newman comes into the shop and Jerry, angry that he sabotaged his relationship with Rachel, chases him out into the street. George goes to Paris with Joey, who gives him a hard time as they wait for Joey's father to show up. Helen and Morty go on a cruise, but discover that the Costanzas are on the same one.

Production
Larry David said the idea of making out at Schindler's List "must have come from sitting in temple ... thinking what would happen if I reached over and touched my wife's breast now, or something like that. ... You know, I just can't pay attention in there, and so my mind wanders, and I think that's why I put that in." Jerry Seinfeld commented that Schindler's List was specifically chosen because they knew that the film's director, Steven Spielberg, was a fan of the show. Aaron's dismay when the Seinfelds return to Florida is an allusion to the scene in Schindler's List in which the title character, Oskar Schindler, is in a state of anguish for not being able to do more to help the doomed Jews during the Holocaust.

The "moths" in the show were added in post-production. Stephen Pearlman was unable to be present at the audience taping of the episode due to scheduling conflicts, so Larry David stood in for him during the taping of his scene. The audience's laughter from the performance with David was then applied to a later filming with Pearlman for the broadcast episode.

References

External links 
 

Seinfeld (season 5) episodes
1994 American television episodes
Seinfeld episodes in multiple parts
Television episodes written by Larry David
Television episodes written by Jerry Seinfeld